Arizona State University Tempe campus is the main campus of Arizona State University, and the largest of the five campuses that comprise the university. The campus lies in the heart of Tempe, Arizona, about eight miles (13 km) east of downtown Phoenix. The campus is arranged around broad pedestrian malls and, in toto, is considered to be an arboretum. ASU has an extensive public art collection, considered one of the ten best among university public art collections in the United States. Against the northwest edge of campus is the Mill Avenue district (part of downtown Tempe) which has a college atmosphere that attracts many students to its restaurants and bars. ASU's Tempe Campus is also home to all of the university's athletic facilities.

History
The Tempe campus is the original campus, and Old Main, the first building constructed on campus in 1894, still stands today. The university used to be named the Arizona Territorial Normal School and was initially used to train public school teachers. In 1925 the college was renamed the Tempe State Teachers College and started offering its first four-year bachelor's degree. After gaining accreditation in 1933, the college started offering graduated programs in 1937. The Tempe campus is also the largest of the four campuses, with 54,866 students enrolled in its programs. There are many notable landmarks on campus, including Grady Gammage Memorial Auditorium, designed by Frank Lloyd Wright. Other notable landmarks include Palm Walk, which is lined by 111 palm trees, Charles Trumbull Hayden Library, Old Main, the University Club Building, and University Bridge.

Academics

The Tempe campus is home to the following schools and colleges:
 College of Liberal Arts and Sciences
 School of Sustainability
 Herberger Institute for Design and the Arts
 Ira A. Fulton School of Engineering
 W.P. Carey School of Business

In addition, the Tempe campus hosts courses and programs offered by the following schools and colleges:
 Barrett, The Honors College (All campuses)
 Graduate College (All campuses)
 Mary Lou Fulton Teachers College
 University College (All campuses)

Residence halls
North Neighborhood
 Manzanita Hall (Freshman – Residential College of Liberal Arts and Sciences and Mary Lou Fulton Teacher's College)
 Tooker Hall (Freshman – Residential College of Ira A. Fulton Schools of Engineering)
 Palo Verde East Hall (Freshman – Residential College of Liberal Arts and Sciences and Mary Lou Fulton Teacher's College)
 Palo Verde West Hall (Freshman – Residential College of Liberal Arts and Science and Mary Lou Fulton Teacher's College)
 San Pablo Hall (Freshman – Residential College of Health Solutions, Mary Lou Fulton Teacher's College, and School for the Future of Innovation in Society)

Center Neighborhood
All residential communities here are for the Herberger Institute for Design and the Arts.
 Best Hall (Freshman and the Arcadia Residential Community for Design and the Arts)
 Hayden Hall (Freshman)
 Irish Hall (Upper Division)
 McClintock Hall (Upper Division students)

South Neighborhood
 Barrett Honors College (Freshman-Senior) (Cereus) (Agave) (Sustainability House at Barrett, SHAB) (Cottonwood) (Rosewood) (Juniper) (Willow)
 Hassayampa Academic Village (A–E) (Mohave Hall – WP Carey School of Business) (Arroyo – WP Carey School of Business) (Jojoba Hall – WP Carey School of Business) (Chuparosa Hall –  – WP Carey School of Business) (Acacia Hall –  – WP Carey School of Business Leader's Academy)
 Hassayampa Academic Village (F–H) (Mesquite Hall – WP Carey School of Business) (Verbena Hall – WP Carey School of Business) (Acourtia Hall – WP Carey School of Business)
 Sonora Center (Freshman-Senior Dependant on Year)
 Adelphi Commons I (Freshman – Mary Lou Fulton Teachers College, College of Liberal Arts and Sciences, Barrett, the Honors College, College of Health Solutions, and W.P. Carey School of Business)
 Adelphi Commons II (Freshman – Residential of Ira A. Fulton Schools of Engineering, College of Integrative Sciences and Arts, and School of Sustainability)

Campus Apartments
 University Towers (Upper division)
 Cholla Apartments (Now permanently closed to make room for the Greek Leadership Village)
 Greek Leadership Village (Upper-division, only for students in sororities and fraternities)
 Vista del Sol (Upper division) – Privately owned, operated, and managed by American Campus Communities through an on campus Real-Estate Investment Trust (Student REIT) set up through American Campus Communities and Arizona State University. This agreement is one of the first of its kind.

See also
 Desert Financial Arena

Gallery

References

External links

 Official website

Arizona State University campuses
Public universities and colleges in Arizona
Education in Tempe, Arizona
Educational institutions established in 1885
Universities and colleges in Maricopa County, Arizona
1885 establishments in Arizona Territory
Tourist attractions in Tempe, Arizona
Arizona State Sun Devils